Corinna Belz (born 1955) is a German documentary filmmaker. She studied philosophy, art history and media studies in Cologne, Zurich and Berlin. She lives in Cologne and Berlin.

She received the 2017 Filmpreis NRW and was nominated for the 2018 Grimme-Preis for Peter Handke: In the Woods, Might Be Late, about the writer Peter Handke.

Selected filmography
  (2009, collaborative work)
  (2011)
 Peter Handke: In the Woods, Might Be Late (2016)
  (2021, co-directed with Enrique Sánchez Lansch)

References

External links
 
 

1955 births
Living people
German documentary film directors
German screenwriters
German film producers
German women film directors
Women documentary filmmakers